Gouffern en Auge (literally Gouffern in Auge) is a commune in the department of Orne, northwestern France. The municipality was established on 1 January 2017 by merger of the former communes of Silly-en-Gouffern (the seat), Aubry-en-Exmes, Avernes-sous-Exmes, Le Bourg-Saint-Léonard, Chambois, La Cochère, Courménil, Exmes, Fel, Omméel, Saint-Pierre-la-Rivière, Survie, Urou-et-Crennes and Villebadin.

See also 
Communes of the Orne department

References 

Communes of Orne